Electric Sweat is the second studio album of The Mooney Suzuki, following on from People Get Ready in 2000. The album was released in April 2002.  It was re-released on Columbia Records in 2003.

Track listing
All tracks by Sammy James, Jr.

"Electric Sweat" - 3:36
"In a Young Man's Mind" - 3:13
"Oh Sweet Susanna" - 3:34
"A Little Bit of Love" - 2:30
"It's Not Easy" - 4:07
"Natural Fact" - 3:00
"It's Showtime Pt. II" - 3:32
"I Woke Up This Mornin'" - 3:44
"The Broken Heart" - 5:31
"Electrocuted Blues" - 2:48

Personnel 

Michael Bangs – bass
Jim Diamond – producer, engineer
Mike Fornatale – cover photo
John Golden – mastering
Sammy James Jr. – guitar, vocals
Todd Osborn – cover photo
Graham Tyler – guitar

References

External links
Album review at Drowned in Sound

2003 albums
The Mooney Suzuki albums